Perscheid' is a German language habitational surname. Notable people with the name include:
 Martin Perscheid (1966–2021), German cartoonist
 Nicola Perscheid (1864–1930), German photographer

References 

German-language surnames
Toponymic surnames